Peter Bruce Smith (7 August 1958 – 29 January 2022) was a New Zealand actor. He performed in important New Zealand films such as The Piano (1993) and Once Were Warriors (1995), as well working on well known television shows, including appearances on The Billy T James Show (1990) and Shortland Street in 1999.

Career 
At the outset of his career, Smith joined a drama course run by Maori film maker Don Selwyn, and soon thereafter performed in several of Selwyn's theatre productions, among them The Gospel according to Taane (1985), The Maori Merchant of Venice (2002) and Te Whai Ao.

Smith made his screen debut with a GOFTA-winning role as one of the last people on earth, in science fiction film The Quiet Earth (1985).

His film credits include many notable New Zealand films, among them The Piano (1993), Once Were Warriors (1995), and the latter's sequel What Becomes of the Broken Hearted (1999). He also featured as an orc in Peter Jackson's The Lord of the Rings: The Return of the King (2003). Additionally, he appeared in the Australian film The Boys in 1998.

Smith also appeared in several television programmes, including E Tipu E Rea (1989), Marlin Bay (1992–94), Plainclothes (1995), Shortland Street (1999), Greenstone (1999), and Mataku (2001–04). He also starred in the drama series The Market (2005), for which he received an award for Best Performance by a supporting Actor at the Air New Zealand Screen Awards.

He performed in comedy skits and sketches in The Billy T James Show (1990) and current events satires Issues and More Issues (1991). Smith has also featured in and narrated several commercials and documentaries.

Smith created, presented, narrated, and directed several episodes of various documentary series, among them Nga Waiata o Te Hiku o Te Ika: Songs of the North (2002) and Maramataka: Once Were Gardeners (2007). The latter, a 13-part series screened on Māori Television, was a look at modern Māori relationships with the land.

Personal life and death
Smith died from kidney disease on 29 January 2022, at the age of 63.

Awards 
Smith won best supporting actor in New Zealand drama feature film Flight of the Albatross (1995).

In 2006, he won Best Performance by a Supporting Actor at the Air New Zealand Screen Awards for his role in The Market.

Selected filmography

Film

Television

Theatre

References

External links
 
 

1958 births
2022 deaths
New Zealand male film actors
New Zealand male Māori actors
People from Kaitaia
Te Aupōuri people
Te Rarawa people
Deaths from kidney disease